Battcock is a surname. Notable people with the surname include:

 Gregory Battcock (1937–1980), American art critic and actor in Andy Warhol films - see Eating Too Fast
 Oliver Battcock (1903–1970), English cricketer
 William Battcock, English cricketer